Anthaxia cichorii is a species of jewel beetle belonging to the family Buprestidae, subfamily Buprestinae.

Description
These beetles can be found from April to August. Larvae feed on Pyrus communis, Malus domestica, Prunus domestica, Ficus carica and Prunus cerasus .

Distribution
This species is present in most of Europe, in the East Palearctic ecozone and in the Near East.

References 

Buprestidae
Beetles of Europe
Beetles described in 1790